Target-Invisible is a 1945 documentary short film produced by the First Motion Picture Unit after World War II. The film depicts the uses of radar in aerial direction-finding and precision high-level bombing by the United States Army Air Forces during World War II.

At the end of Target-Invisible, the air force narrator (Arthur Kennedy) thanks Americans for their contributions to the war effort but even though the war is over. The film mentions the dropping of the atom bomb in August 1945. The plea is for Americans to help win the peace by supporting scientific efforts through buying Victory Loan war bonds.

Plot
In 1945, a USAAF Boeing B-29 Superfortress squadron of bombers flies from their base in the Marianas on their mission to attack a target in Japan. Although the target will be invisible due to overcast conditions, the mission will continue as a high-altitude bombing raid.

After six hours of flight time, the radar operator (Clayton Moore) is able to identify the islands that lie off the coast of Honshu. Directions from the radar operator to the bombardier help guide the B-29 to its ultimate target. The pilot is also given discrete flight adjustments to fly directly to the objective.

After arriving above the target at 23,000 ft altitude, although obscured by a thick cloud cover, the bombardier uses the Norden bombsight to aim, before releasing the bomb load. The attack is successful with widespread destruction of the Kiyoshi aircraft plant located north of Tokyo.

Cast
 Arthur Kennedy as Air force narrator (Uncredited)
 Clayton Moore as B-29 radar operator (Uncredited)

Production
Target-Invisible was produced for the Motion Pictures and Special Events Division of the War Finance Division, U.S. Treasury Department. The short has an orchestral score, and has a combination of live-action shot in the Culver City, California studios and stock combat footage of B-29s.

Intended Purpose and Audience
Target-Invisible was typical of the films of the period produced under the auspices of the Office of War Information.
In the closing minute, the narrator states that the movie's purpose is to encourage the post-WWII public to buy bonds
so that scientists can continue to develop inventions like radar for the security of the nation at peace.

See also
List of Allied Propaganda Films of World War 2

References

Notes

Bibliography

 Koppes, Clayton R. and Gregory D. Black. Hollywood Goes to War: How Politics, Profits and Propaganda Shaped World War II Movies. New York, The Free Press, 1987. .
 Moore, Clayton and Frank Thompson. I Was That Masked Man. New York: Taylor Trade Publishing;, 1998. .

External links
 
 Complete film at Google Video

1945 films
American World War II propaganda shorts
American aviation films
First Motion Picture Unit films
Articles containing video clips
American black-and-white films
American short documentary films
1940s short documentary films
1940s American films